It's Nifty in the Navy is a 1965 Danish comedy film directed by Finn Henriksen and starring Dirch Passer.

Cast

Dirch Passer as Valdemar Jensen
Ghita Nørby as Hanne Hansen
Ove Sprogøe as Knud Hansen
Paul Hagen as Svend Nielsen
Hans W. Petersen as Peter Hansen
Carl Ottosen as Kompagnichef
Kai Holm as Fiskeeksportør
Jan Priiskorn-Schmidt as Jan Hansen
Karl Stegger as Bådsmanden
Preben Mahrt as Chefen
Sigrid Horne-Rasmussen as Frk. Mortensen
Bent Vejlby as Befalingsmand
Katja Miehe-Renard as Lise
Axel Strøbye as Telegrafist
Gyda Hansen as Karen
Hugo Herrestrup as Anton 'Balle' Nicholaisen
Jesper Langberg as Kok
Svend Bille as Overtjener Karlsen
Bjørn Spiro as Kaptajn på færge
Holger Vistisen as Styrmand på færge
Kirsten Passer as Svends venindes søster
Valsø Holm as Spiller billiard med Svend
Arthur Jensen as Bankdirektør

External links

1965 films
1965 comedy films
1960s Danish-language films
Films directed by Finn Henriksen
Danish comedy films